= Sol de Julio =

Coordinates: 29°33′S 63°27′W

- Municipality and village
- Interactive map of Sol de Julio
- Country: Argentina
- Province: Santiago del Estero
- Time zone: UTC−3 (ART)

Sol de Julio is a municipality and village in Santiago del Estero in Argentina.
